Tabasalu Jalgpalliklubi was an Estonian football club based in Tabasalu. The club was founded in 1999. The team last played in the II Liiga, the third highest level of Estonian football. The team was dissolved in 2013, and a new team, JK Tabasalu, was created.

References

External links
 Club website

Defunct football clubs in Estonia
Association football clubs established in 1999
Harku Parish
1999 establishments in Estonia